SUN BEAM – is Lithuanian beach ultimate tournament organized in coastal city Klaipėda beach - Smiltynė. Currently it is the biggest beach Ultimate tournament among the Baltic States. The first tournament was played in 2011. Tournament annually takes place at middle of July in unique stretch of land - "Curonian Spit", which is UNESCO heritage site.

Event gathers the most ultimate teams from Baltic States (Lithuania, Latvia, Estonia), Belarus, Poland, Russia, Finland.

Description
SUN BEAM tournament is being played according to official beach (5 on 5) ultimate tournament rules,.

Tournament system: robin round games that advances to playoffs.

 Open and Mixed divisions
 Time cap: 45 minutes 
 Point cap: 13 points

Results

References

External links 
 Official "SUN BEAM" website

Ultimate (sport) competitions